Atanas Andreev (born 15 January 1960) is a Bulgarian rower. He competed in the men's coxed pair event at the 1988 Summer Olympics.

References

1960 births
Living people
Bulgarian male rowers
Olympic rowers of Bulgaria
Rowers at the 1988 Summer Olympics
Rowers from Sofia